is a dam in Uonuma, Niigata Prefecture, Japan, completed in 1958.

References 

Dams in Niigata Prefecture
Dams completed in 1958